Figure Eight Lake is a lake in Alberta.

Lakes of Alberta
County of Northern Lights